The 1987–88 United Counties League season was the 81st in the history of the United Counties League, a football competition in England.

Premier Division

The Premier Division featured 19 clubs which competed in the division last season, along with two new clubs, promoted from Division One:
Baker Perkins
Cogenhoe United

League table

Division One

Division One featured 17 clubs which competed in the division last season, along with three new clubs:
Ampthill Town, relegated from the Premier Division
Blisworth, joined from the Northamptonshire Combination
Bugbrooke St Michaels, joined from the Northamptonshire Combination

League table

References

External links
 United Counties League

1987–88 in English football leagues
United Counties League seasons